The Strangers in the House (Les Inconnus dans la maison) is a 1942 French drama film by Henri Decoin after the novel by the same name by Georges Simenon in 1940.

It was shot at the Billancourt Studios in Paris.

Plot
Hector Loursat, attorney at law, lives with his daughter, Nicole, in a vast and shabby mansion in a provincial town. Their conversation with each other is limited, each somehow holding the other one responsible for the situation: Hector Loursat used to be one of the great attorneys until his wife left him for another man eighteen years ago. He has been drinking ever since, and given up living altogether, intoxicated every night. Hector did not care much about his daughter, who was brought up by Fine, the old woman servant in the house.

One night, gunshots are heard upstairs in the house and Hector spots a shadow running away. Hector goes upstairs with Nicole and finds a dead man lying on an old bed in the attic. The police arrive and investigate. Hector soon finds out his daughter has a kind of secret life with a band of young idle bourgeois from the town; they have regular meetings in the attic.

The police soon determine that the dead man is called Gros Louis, with a criminal record. Nicole and her friends are being interrogated by the police. But how is Gros Louis linked to the group? They find out the young group have set up amongst themselves a sort of pact, a theft competition which started by stealing a ballpoint or a lighter, and was amplified by boredom up to grand theft auto. Thus, they were turned delinquents by ennui. The police also finds out that one of them, Emile, is Nicole's boyfriend. Did he kill Gros Louis because of jealousy? Emile is suspected, and arrested. In jail, Emile asks Hector Loursat to be his attorney. Hector, scenting a miscarriage of justice, agrees to be his defense attorney.

At the trial, the prosecution produces many bona fide witnesses, all bourgeois parents. Hector Loursat does not budge, has no questions to ask the witnesses, doesn't seem to be there altogether, to the point where people, and his daughter among them, wonder, with awe, if he is not still drinking. When finally Hector Loursat stands up and speaks, everyone is bewildered by his speech and strategy. First, he does not want to call any defense witnesses, but instead wants all the prosecution witnesses to come back to the stand, and accuses them all of being responsible for the boredom of the town, responsible for the boredom and nonsense and stupid behavior of their young ones, then singles out the fact that only one girl - his own daughter, Nicole - was in the group. By interrogating each of the young men, he shows that every one of them was in love with her, except, apparently, one, Luska. But Hector Loursat soon proves Luska was the one most in love with Nicole, that he found out Emile was Nicole's boyfriend, and that he killed Gros Louis to have Emile accused, moved aside and framed. At this point, Luska cracks up, confesses, and is arrested. Nicole falls into her father's arms.

Cast
 Raimu : Hector Loursat
 André Reybaz as Émile Manu
 Tania Fédor as Marthe Dossin
 Héléna Manson as Mme Manu
 Gabrielle Fontan as Fine, the old maid
 Marcel Mouloudji as Amédée or Ephraïm Luska (Marcel Mouloudjy)
 Noël Roquevert as commissaire Alfred Binet
 Jacques Grétillat as court president
 Martine Carol as a court spectator (uncredited)
 Jean Négroni
 Daniel Gélin
 Marguerite Ducouret as Angèle, the cook
 Lucien Coëdel as the bar tenant
 Marc Doelnitz as Edmond Dossin
 Juliette Faber as Nicole Loursat
 Jacques Baumer as the attorney Rogissart
 Génia Vaury as Mme Laurence Rogissart
 Jean Tissier as judge Ducup
 Raymond Cordy as a huissier
 Lucien Bryonne as a police officer
 Fernand Flament as a police officer
 Paul Barge as prison gard (uncredited)
 Langlois as uncle Daillat (uncredited)
 Henri Delivry
 Jacques Denoël
 Lise Donat
 Franck Maurice
 Bernard Noël
 Claire Olivier
 Max Révol
 Pierre Ringel
 Yvonne Scheffer
 Simone Sylvestre
 Charles Vissières
 Pierre Fresnay: narrator

External links 
 

Films based on Belgian novels
Films based on works by Georges Simenon
French black-and-white films
Films with screenplays by Henri-Georges Clouzot
1942 films
1940s French-language films
French drama films
1942 drama films
Films directed by Henri Decoin
Films shot at Billancourt Studios
Continental Films films
1940s French films